Danmark Rundt is a Danish stage race for professional road bicycle racers organized as a part of the UCI Continental Circuits.  It is currently sponsored by the Danish national postal agency, PostNord, and the race is therefore also known as PostNord Danmark Rundt. The 2019 edition had 20 teams, with 6 riders each, participating in 5 stages. The race is sometimes called the Tour of Denmark in English language media.

Course
Traditionally, the race starts off on the Jutland peninsula and ends on the island of Zealand – on Frederiksberg Allé in Copenhagen. Since 2004, one of the stages has included the steep street Kiddesvej in the city of Vejle. It's this hilly stage and the time trial that usually determine who will win the general classification.

History
The race was first run yearly from 1985 to 1988 and, after a break of 7 years, from 1995 onwards. It attracts approximately half a million spectators on the road.

After no less than five second places overall, including twice before the race hiatus of 1989–1994, Rolf Sørensen finally secured overall victory in his home race in 2000.

In 2004 it was won by Kurt Asle Arvesen, after his  teammate Jens Voigt let him win an intermediate sprint, so Arvesen finished 2 seconds ahead in the overall classification. In 2005 Ivan Basso of Team CSC, coming off the 2005 Tour de France as the overall runner-up, totally dominated the race, and won overall as well as 4 out of 6 stages.  Since the race was run at the same time as the UCI ProTour race Eneco Tour, only three UCI ProTour teams participated.

In 2006, the race was won by Fabian Cancellara of CSC ahead of Stuart O'Grady, also of CSC and in 2007 Kurt Asle Arvesen returned to win for the second time, being the first in history to do so, and giving Team CSC its 4th consecutive win. In 2008 Jakob Fuglsang from Team Designa Køkken became the first Dane to win since 2002. In 2009 he became the first rider to win the race two years in a row before going on to win for a third consecutive year in 2010. Fuglsang was succeeded by Australian rider Simon Gerrans in 2011, Lieuwe Westra in 2012 and Wilco Kelderman in 2013.

The 2014 Danmark Rundt was won by Danish rider Michael Valgren of the  team. The 2015 edition was planned to start on 4 August 2014, with the first stage scheduled to begin in Struer and end in Holstebro. It ended on 8 August. The 2015 Danmark Rundt was won by Danish rider Christopher Juul-Jensen of the  team.

Winners by year

Podium positions

Secondary classifications
Various secondary competitions have been held over the years.

*In 1985, 1986 and 1987 the competition was for riders under 23 years, in 1988 the bar was raised to 24 years, and in  2000 and later editions, it has been for riders born in or after (race year) – 25 years (i.e. in 2000 they had to be born in or after 1975).

Other classifications
In addition to the five competitions above, in all editions except the 1985 and 1995 ones, a fighter competition was held.

Former classifications
Until 2000, a sprint competition was held.
In 1987 and 1988 a "Best Dane" competition was held.
In 1995, a "Best Amateur" competition was held.

Winners by nation
A complete list over overall winners by nation of the Post Danmark Rundt.

Most stage wins
A list of the riders with the most stage wins in the Post Danmark Rundt.

Classifications
As of the 2018 edition, the jerseys worn by the leaders of the individual classifications are:
  Blue Jersey – Worn by the leader of the general classification.
  Green Jersey – Worn by the leader of the points classification.
  Polkadot Jersey – Worn by the leader of the climber classification. 
  White Jersey – Worn by the best rider under 23 years of age on the overall classification.

References

External links

 
Cycle races in Denmark
Recurring sporting events established in 1985
1985 establishments in Denmark
UCI Europe Tour races
Summer events in Denmark